The Story of Vernon and Irene Castle is a 1939 American biographical musical comedy directed by H.C. Potter. The film stars Fred Astaire, Ginger Rogers, Edna May Oliver, and Walter Brennan. The film is based on the stories My Husband and My Memories of Vernon Castle, by Irene Castle.  The movie was adapted by Oscar Hammerstein II, Dorothy Yost and Richard Sherman.  This was Astaire and Rogers' ninth and last film together with RKO. Their final pairing was The Barkleys of Broadway (1949) at MGM.

Plot
The film tells of novice American dancer Irene Foote (Ginger Rogers) who convinces New York-based British vaudeville comic Vernon Castle (Fred Astaire) to give up slapstick comedy in favor of sophisticated ballroom dancing.

Their big break comes when they are stranded in Paris, along with their friend Walter Ashe (Walter Brennan), with no money. They catch the eye of influential agent Maggie Sutton (Edna May Oliver), who arranges a tryout for them at the prestigious Café de Paris, where they become an overnight sensation. After taking Europe by storm, the Castles return to the United States and become just as big a sensation. Their fame and fortune rises to unprecedented heights in the immediate pre-World War I years.

When World War I starts, Vernon returns to Britain and joins the Royal Flying Corps, while Irene makes patriotic movie serials to aid the war effort. However, Vernon is killed in a training accident, leaving Irene to carry on alone.

Cast

 Fred Astaire as Vernon Castle
 Ginger Rogers as Irene Castle (née Foote)
 Edna May Oliver as Maggie Sutton
 Walter Brennan as Walter Ash
 Lew Fields as himself
 Etienne Girardot as Papa Aubel
 Janet Beecher as Mrs. Foote
 Rolfe Sedan as Emile Aubel
 Leonid Kinskey as Artist
 Robert Strange as Dr. Hubert Foote
 Douglas Walton as Student Pilot
 Clarence Derwent as Papa Louis
 Sonny Lamont as Charlie, Tap Dancer
 Frances Mercer as Claire Ford
 Victor Varconi as Grand Duke
 Donald MacBride as Hotel Manager
 Leyland Hodgson as British Sergeant
 Lillian Yarbo as Mary, Claire's Maid (uncredited)

Production
Irene Castle acted as advisor to this film, and constantly disagreed with the director as to details of costuming and liberties taken. When informed that white actor Walter Brennan was to play the part of faithful servant Walter, she was dumbfounded: the real Walter was black.

The film marks several "firsts": the characters in it are more realistic than usual in an Astaire-Rogers film, there is none of the usual "screwball comedy" relief provided by such actors as Edward Everett Horton, Victor Moore, or Helen Broderick, it is the only Astaire-Rogers musical biography, the only one on which Oscar Hammerstein II worked, the only one of their musicals with a tragic ending, and the only one in which Astaire's character dies.

Reception
The film was popular in the US, making $1,120,000 and it also earned $705,000 elsewhere. However, due to high costs RKO accounts recorded the film as losing $50,000.

Footnotes

External links
 
 
 
 
 The Story of Vernon and Irene Castle at the Reel Classics web site; contains plot detail.

1939 films
1930s biographical films
1939 musical comedy films
American biographical films
American black-and-white films
American musical comedy films
Biographical films about entertainers
1930s English-language films
Films directed by H. C. Potter
Films set in the 1910s
Films set in Paris
Films set in Westchester County, New York
Films with screenplays by Dorothy Yost
Musical films based on actual events
RKO Pictures films
American World War I films
Films based on biographies
Cultural depictions of dancers
1930s American films